Famous First Words may refer to:

 Famous First Words (Gil Grand album), a 1998 country album
 "Famous First Words" (song), title song of the Grand album
 Famous First Words (Viva Brother album), a 2011 rock album